For electronic semiconductor devices, a native transistor (or sometimes natural transistor) is a variety of the MOS field-effect transistor that is intermediate between enhancement and depletion modes. Most common is the n-channel native transistor.

Historically, native transistors were referred to as MOSFETs without specially grown oxide, only natural thin oxide film formed over silicon during processing of other layers.

A native MOSFET is a transistor with nearly zero threshold voltage. Native n-channel transistors have a niche applications in low-voltage operational amplifiers and in low-voltage digital memory, where it functions as the weak pull-down. It is also used in low-voltage interface circuits. In most CMOS processes, native N-channel MOSFETs are fabricated on the "native" slightly p-doped silicon that comprises the bulk region, whereas a non-native N-channel MOSFET is fabricated in a p-well, which has a higher concentration of positive charges due to the increased presence of holes. The lower concentration of positive charges in the channel of a native device means that less voltage at the gate terminal is required to repel these positive charges and form a depletion region under the gate with a conducting channel, which translates to the native device having a smaller threshold voltage.

The main disadvantages of the native transistor are the larger size due to additional doping mask, and sometimes lower transconductance. Native silicon has a lower conductivity than silicon in an n-well or p-well, as most MOSFETs are, and therefore must be larger to achieve equivalent conductance. Typical minimal size of the native N-channel MOSFET (NMOS) gate is 2-3 times longer and wider than standard threshold voltage transistor. The cost of chips including native transistors is also increased because of the additional doping operations.

References

External links 
 Native NMOS circuit example

Transistor types